Talman  may refer to:

 Ibanez Talman, an electric guitar
 Talman (surname), a surname
 Talman Gardner (born 1980), American football player
 The Speaker of the Parliament of Sweden (the Riksdag)

See also

 Tallman (disambiguation)
 Thalman